Vlado Taneski (1952 – June 23, 2008) was a Macedonian journalist and serial killer. He was arrested in June 2008 in Kičevo, his hometown, for the murders of two women on whose deaths he had also written freelance articles; when arrested he was also being investigated over the death of an additional woman. These articles had aroused the suspicion of the police as they contained information which had not been released to the public. After DNA tests connected Taneski to the murders, he was arrested and imprisoned on June 22, 2008. Taneski was found dead in his cell the following day, after an apparent suicide.

Personal life
Vlado Taneski was born in 1952 in Kičevo, SFR Yugoslavia, the second of three children. Both of his parents were conservative disciplinarians, and he had a particularly tense relationship with his mother. His father was a World War II veteran. After studying journalism in Croatia, Taneski began an interest in poetry and writing. At age 21 he met his future wife, a law student named Vesna, with whom he had two children.

Taneski initially worked at a radio station, while Vesna went on to become Kičevo's first female lawyer. By the 1980s he worked as a reporter for Skopje-based newspapers Nova Makedonija and Utrinski Vesnik, and his career ultimately spanned twenty years. In 2002 his father committed suicide and, a few months later, his mother accidentally overdosed on medicine. In 2003, exacerbating the financial problems he was facing, Taneski was laid off from Nova Makedonija, and in 2004 his wife received a promotion and moved to Skopje.

Murders
Taneski's victims were:
 Mitra Simjanoska (64) – disappeared November 16, 2004 after a trip to the market; found January 12, 2005. She had been strangled, bound, tortured, and raped, and had been dead for less than two weeks.
 Ljubica Licoska (56) – disappeared in early November 2007 after going to buy groceries; found on February 3, 2008. She had been strangled, bound, beaten, and raped, and had been dead for only a few days.
 Zivana Temelkoska (65) – disappeared on May 7, 2008 after a hoax about her son being hospitalised; found on May 16. She had been tortured, raped, strangled, and was bound with telephone cords.

All these women were poor, uneducated cleaners, which was also how Taneski's mother had earned a living. The victims had known Taneski's mother personally, which may have been the reason for their selection as victims.

Investigation and suicide
Taneski came under suspicion for murder after having written articles about the three murders and was questioned on several occasions. According to police, Taneski's articles contained information which had not been released to the public. For example, differing from all other reports published in the Macedonian press on the murders, Taneski knew that the killer used a telephone cord to bind Temelkoska and that the same cord was left at the scene by the murderer.

Taneski was arrested on June 20, 2008, after his DNA was matched to semen found on the victims. Examination of the Taneski family's rural cottage uncovered a cache of pornographic material, ropes and cords matching those used to tie the victims, and items belonging to the victims. Taneski was charged with the murder of two of the women, and the police were preparing to charge him with the murder of the third. Details of the case were printed on June 21, and police were also planning to question Taneski on the May 30, 2003, disappearance of the 73-year-old retired cleaner, Gorica Pavleska. After being transferred to Tetovo, Taneski was found dead in his shared prison cell on June 23. He had apparently drowned in a plastic bucket of water. An inquest concluded that, in the absence of other evidence, his death was suicide.

See also 
 Wallace Souza – Brazilian journalist accused of setting up murders for ratings
 John Wayne Glover – nicknamed the "Granny Killer"
 Karol Kot – a Polish serial killer
 List of serial killers by country

References 

1952 births
2008 suicides
20th-century journalists
Macedonian people who died in prison custody
Macedonian journalists
Macedonian serial killers
Male journalists
Male serial killers
People from Kičevo
Prisoners who died in North Macedonia detention
Serial killers who committed suicide in prison custody
Suicides by drowning
Suicides in North Macedonia